A list of films produced in Hong Kong in 1999:.

1999

See also
1999 in Hong Kong

Notes

External links
 IMDB list of Hong Kong films
 Hong Kong films of 1999 at HKcinemamagic.com

1999
Hong Kong
1999 in Hong Kong